"Funtime" is a single released by The Spitfire Boys, on Impeccable Records, in 1979. The band's line-up on this release were David Littler (lead vocals, guitar), the only remaining member of the band, and ex-Nylonz members, Peter Millman (guitar), Kurt Prasser (bass) and Chris Brazier (drums).

The band was formed in Cardiff, Wales, as The White Brothers, by David Francis after dissolving The Photons, but before the release of the single, he was persuaded to rename themselves as The Spitfire Boys, for better sales.

Track list
"Funtime"
"Transcendental Changing"

Personnel
David Francis: lead vocals, guitar
Peter Millman: guitar
Kurt Prasser: bass
Chris Brazier: drums

References

External links

1979 songs
1979 singles
The Spitfire Boys songs